Eponymous fractures and fracture-dislocations are most commonly named after the doctor who first described them. They may also be named after an activity with which they are associated.

Some of these terms are historic.

Notes 

Fractures